Ranadheera is a 1988 Indian Kannada language musical action film starring Ravichandran and Khushbu. Directed by Ravichandran himself, the film was produced by his father N. Veeraswamy under Eshwari Productions. Kushboo gained popularity in Karnataka through this film. The music was composed by Hamsalekha.

The film was a remake of the 1983 Hindi film Hero directed by Subhash Ghai. The film was dubbed in Tamil as Veeran.

The movie was the highest-grossing Kannada movie of the year 1988. The movie saw a theatrical run of 25 weeks and was declared a Blockbuster at the box office and recorded 108 days of full-house shows in Kapali theatre Amitabh Bachchan was the chief guest at the event held to mark the 25 week run of the movie.

Plot
The story starts off with Basha (Sudheer) being taken to prison. To get out of the situation, he writes to his best man, Ranadheera (Ravichandran). Ranadheera goes to Jagannath (Lokesh) and warns him. He then kidnaps Jagannath's daughter Radha (Kushboo). He tells her that he is a police officer and they fall in love; however, she finds out that he is a goon. Nevertheless, she does not leave him but urges him to surrender. Transformed by true love, Ranadheera surrenders himself to the police and is imprisoned for two years. Back home, Radha tells her brother Anand (Anant Nag) the whole truth. To prevent Radha from marrying someone else, he calls his friend Jimmy (Jai Jagadish) to put on a show that Radha and Jimmy love each other. Jimmy misunderstands the situation and falls in love with Radha. When Ranadheera comes back, he starts working in a garage and tries to reform himself. Despite everything, Jagannath kicks him out of his life. After many days and events that follow, Anand finds out that Jimmy is a drug smuggler. After escaping from prison, Basha desires revenge against both Jagannath and Ranadheera, so he kidnaps Radha, Jagannath and Anand. Ranadheera comes at the last moment and frees all of them. In the end, Jagannath lets Radha marry Ranadheera.

Cast
 Ravichandran as Ranadheera/Murali
 Anant Nag as Inspector Anand
 Khushbu as Radha
 Lokesh as IGP Jagannath (Radha's father)
 Jai Jagadish as Singapore Champion Jimmy
 Jayachitra as Shanti (Anand's wife)
 Master Manjunath
 Umashree as Yamuna Bai
 Sudheer as Basha
 Jaggesh as Maadhu 
 Mukhyamantri Chandru as Rajaram
 Doddanna as Lawyer
 Rathasapthami Aravind as Sanju 
 Killer Venkatesh as Rizzu 
 C. P. Yogeeshwara as Gangu 
 H.M.T. Nanda as Paddu 
 Shani Mahadevappa
 K. Vijaya as Radha's mother

Soundtrack

Hamsalekha composed music for the soundtracks and also wrote their lyrics. Cassettes and records sold like hot cakes in those days. The album was popular among youths. The album consists of ten soundtracks.

References

External links
 

1988 films
1980s Kannada-language films
Kannada remakes of Hindi films
Films scored by Hamsalekha
Films directed by V. Ravichandran